État Pied-Noir refers to the claim made by certain Pied-Noir persons and organisations to sovereignty and nationhood.

History
The Pied-Noir are a people of European-origin born in French-occupied North Africa and, in particular, Algeria. They left en masse as French citizens following the end of the Algerian war, and settled mostly in the south of France. Although French citizens, the Pieds-Noirs were largely descended from Catalan, Italian, and Maltese settlers, as well as ethnic French. They have nevertheless remained for the most part fiercely loyal to France throughout the history of French Algeria and its aftermath.

Provisional government
The Gouvernement provisoire Pied-Noir en exil was created on 1 October 2016 in Montpellier by a small group of veteran Pied-Noir activists in response to what they saw as marginalization by successive French governments. A written constitution was formalised the following year in Nice. This document outlines the aims of peace and neutrality as well as the basis for Pied-Noir sovereignty as claimed in international law. The GPPNE has expressed a desire for membership of the Unrepresented Nations and Peoples Organization and even to acquire a territory in the Mediterranean region, under the name of "the federation of the Two Shores", They dream of acquiring a separate territory, in France, Spain or Algeria, although they have made no specific territorial claims. "Yesterday, a million Pieds-Noirs became migrants. Today, through births and alliances, there are 5 million of them, Located mainly on the mediteranian coast of Algeria, but established on all the Continents and in all areas of human activity. They have become an essential force of memory and testimony". 

On July 4, 2016, Maître Jacques Villard wrote and signed the declaration of self-determination of the Pied-Noir People and the Pied-Noir Nation. On October 1, 2016, Maître Pierre Courbis wrote and signed the founding act of the Pied-Noir State.  The objective of the Pied-Noir State, before May 13, 2022, was to sign a purchase agreement for the acquisition of a national territory northwestern shore of the Mediterranean. 

The Motto of the Fédération des Deux Rives, Pied Noir State, La paix pour seul combat ! directly translates into Peace for only combat!

Flag 
The Dove of Peace on a blue background refers us to the motto of the State: Peace for only combat. The three colors of the French Flag recall our love of France and our attachment to La Francophonie. The Blue of the Sea evokes the support of our arrival in North Africa, our exile and our dispersion in the world. The White underlines our peaceful commitment in the world and our desire for neutrality in the conflicts of this world. The Red indelibly marks the blood shed and the blood received, the old and new generations of Pieds-Noirs.

In the middle of the white, the Sun which made the Blackfoot People grow and, in the center of the sun, these Blackfoot symbols of our specificity and our unity. The Four Stars are the identification of the countries where we were born and prospered: Morocco, Algeria, Tunisia and Egypt.

See also
 Volkstaat
 Separatism
 Arab-Berber
 Kouloughlis
 Turco-Tunisians
 European Tunisians
 Italian Tunisians
 French people
 White Africans of European ancestry
 Processo Revolucionário Em Curso
 List of French possessions and colonies

References 

Governments in exile
2016 establishments in France
Political organizations based in France
Secessionist organizations
Micronations in France
Pieds-Noirs